Newton Longville is a village and civil parish in the unitary authority area of Buckinghamshire, England.

History
The toponym "Newton" is derived from the Old English for "new farm". It is recorded in the Domesday Book of 1086 as Nevtone. The affix "Longville" was added in the 13th century after the Cluniac priory of Longueville, Calvados, in Normandy, France, that held the manor of Newton at that time, and to distinguish this village from other places called Newton, particularly nearby Newton Blossomville. In 1441, when its previous holder died without an heir, the Crown bestowed the manor on the Warden and fellows of New College, Oxford.

Parts of the Church of England parish church of Saint Faith are late 12th century, but the exterior is largely Perpendicular Gothic.

Newton Longville has a number of cruck-framed thatched houses dating from the mid to late 15th century, with good examples at Moor End.

Newton Longville is twinned with Longueville-sur-Scie in Normandy, France.

The main industry in the village between 1847 and 1991 was brick making. The village had a large brick factory, originally belonging to the Read family, becoming the Bletchley Brick company in 1923, and then taken over by the London Brick Company (LBC) in 1929. The works made Fletton bricks and distributed them all over the country. It was closed in November 1991 after Hanson Trust bought the London Brick Company.

Amenities
Newton Longville Church of England Combined School is a mixed, voluntary controlled primary school, that takes children between the ages of four and eleven. It has slightly over 200 pupils.

Salden Chase
In 2009 Buckinghamshire County Council proposed a new settlement called "Salden Chase" outside Newton Longville, however due to an extended planning process work has not commenced on the development.

References

Sources and further reading

External links

Newton Longville C of E Combined School

Villages in Buckinghamshire
Civil parishes in Buckinghamshire